The 2021–22 season is Veria's 3rd season in existence and 1st ever in the second tier of the Greek football league system, and 1st after the foundation of the Super League 2. The contents of this article cover club activities from 1 July 2021 until 30 May 2022.

Players

Personnel

Management

Coaching staff

Source: Veria NFC

Transfers

In

Out

Pre-season and friendlies

Competitions

Super League 2

League table

Results summary

Regular season matches

Play-off round matches

Play-out round matches

Greek Football Cup

Third round

References

External links

 official website

Veria NFC seasons
Greek football clubs 2021–22 season